Petronas Gallery (Malay: Galeri Petronas) is a contemporary art gallery established in 1993 by the Malaysian multinational company Petronas to promote arts and culture.

History 
Galeri Petronas was established in 1993 at the Dayabumi Complex, the former headquarters of Petronas. Its establishment created a major new venue for the display of visual art in Kuala Lumpur. Through the gallery, Petronas sponsored many art exhibitions showing works of both local and foreign artists.

The gallery was relocated to its present prime location in the Petronas Twin Towers in 1998. The new circular gallery of 2000 sq meters is almost three times the size of the gallery in the Dayabumi Complex.

Objectives
Galeri Petronas manages and administers the Petronas sponsorship programme for the visual arts. As part of this programme, the corporation provides and maintains the gallery as a venue for Malaysian artists to display their artwork and to undertake activities for their further development. The gallery also hosts foreign exhibitions.

The gallery offers a wide range of art appreciation and educational programmes, in addition to an active programme of exhibitions. Forums and seminars discussing various art issues are organised on a regular basis.

Design 

Robert Gaukroger designed the Gallery located at level 3 of the Petronas Twin Towers as part of a consortium with Pakatan Architects and Equus Design, when Robert was living in Malaysia. The design was a competition entry which was held by Petronas. Robert Gaukroger’s design philosophy for the gallery was a simple multifunctional space which was a safe container for the display of art, beautifully detailed, although not competing with the works on display. influences of Carlo Scarpa are present in some of the detailing including the reception desk (a single piece of black granite) and a sculptural wall of glass and concrete in the reception area.

In addition to a total art display space of 1135.92 m2, the gallery is also equipped with two multimedia spaces each measuring 30.1 m2, three dry workshops each measuring 46 m2, and a lecture room measuring 40.97 m2. These multi-purpose spaces are used for art demonstrations, forums, classes and lectures, performances and other art activities.

Woods Bagot provided detail design and site regulation services for the premiere art gallery facilities. The 2 207.38 m2 fitout incorporated mobile walling system and flexible lighting, retail shops, workshop studio and electronic library.

Literature

External links
 Galeri Petronas homepage

1993 establishments in Malaysia
Petronas
Art museums and galleries in Kuala Lumpur